The 2017 World Seniors Championship was a snooker tournament, that took place at the Baths Hall in Scunthorpe, England, from 22 to 24 March 2017. Qualifying for the tournament was open to non-tour players, who were aged 40 and over on 1 January 2017. The champion received a place in the qualifying tournament for the 2017 World Snooker Championship in Sheffield.

Mark Davis was the champion of the previous event. However he was not eligible for this year's edition, as it was exclusively for non-tour players. Snooker Legends organised the event for the first time having replaced the WPBSA who previously sanctioned the event. Peter Lines won the tournament without losing a single frame. He beat John Parrott 4–0 in the final.

Prize fund 
The breakdown of the tournament prizes is shown below:
 Winner: £10,000 and a place in WC qualifying 
 Runner-up: £3,000
 Semi-finalist: £1,500
 Quarter-finalist: £500
 Highest break: £500
 Total: £18,500

Field

Seeded players
Players were seeded based on the titles won during their professional careers:

  Stephen Hendry – 7 world titles (1990, 1992–96, 1999), 18 triple crown events
  Cliff Thorburn – 1 world title (1980), 4 triple crown events
  John Parrott – 1 world title (1991), 2 triple crown events, 9 ranking events
  Dennis Taylor – 1 world title (1985), 2 triple crown events, 2 ranking events
  Joe Johnson – 1 world title (1986), 1 triple crown event
  Patsy Fagan – 1 triple crown event
  Tony Knowles – 2 ranking events
  Willie Thorne – 1 ranking event

Steve Davis, Ray Reardon, Terry Griffiths, Tony Meo and Doug Mountjoy were invited to take part, but declined.

Qualifying
Four qualifying events took place during February and March 2017:

 17–19 February: The Crucible Sports and Social Club, Newbury, England (Qualifying Event 1)
 
 23–25 February: The Northern Snooker Centre, Leeds, England (Qualifying Event 2)
 
 3–5 March: Ballroom Nürnberg, Nuremberg, Germany (Qualifying Event 3)
 
 10–12 March – D’Arcy McGees at Spawell, Dublin, Ireland (Qualifying Event 4)
 

Each qualifier took their place alongside the eight invited players in the main draw of the championship.

Main draw 

 All matches were played with a 30-second shot clock with players having two time-outs per match
 *Re-spotted black ball replaced final frame deciders

Final

50+ breaks 
 69  Peter Lines
 55  Aiden Owens

References 

2017
2017 in snooker
2017 in English sport
Sport in Scunthorpe
World Seniors Championship